Riccardo Fogli (born 21 October 1947 in Pontedera, Province of Pisa, Italy) is an Italian singer.

Biography

Early career
Riccardo Fogli was born on 21 October 1947 in Pontedera. He was fond of music since his childhood and taught himself to play the electric bass guitar. At 14 years old he started working in the Piaggio factory.

In 1964, at the age of 17, Fogli joined the band Gli Slenders. Two years later, in 1966, he became the lead singer of Pooh. In 1973, at the peak of popularity with the band, because of personal problems (the breakup of his marriage and a tempestuous relationship with singer Patty Pravo), he left Pooh and started his solo career.

In 1973, Fogli issued his first album Ciao amore come stai (Hello, Love, How Are You?), which was followed by his second album Riccardo Fogli in 1976; the song "Mondo" ("World") from this album became a hit.

1980s
The 1980s were a pinnacle of success for Riccardo Fogli. In this period, the lyrics of his songs became more philosophical and his singing manner became more emotional.  In 1981, Fogli performed one of his most famous and lyrical song, "Malinconia" ("Melancholy"), and in 1982 he was the winner of the Festival di Sanremo with his other hit "Storie di tutti i giorni" ("Everyday Stories") His 1982 album Collezione (Collection) was issued in nearly a million copies in Western Europe, Japan and the USSR, where he became particularly popular.

Riccardo Fogli participated in Eurovision Song Contest with the entry "Per Lucia" ("For Lucia") in 1983; he finished in 11th place and received 41 points.

Fogli was married to and then divorced from the Italian singer Viola Valentino.

In 2016, he reunited with Pooh for the final tour, which celebrated the 50 anniversary of band foundation.

Discography

Albums
Ciao amore, come stai (1975)
Riccardo Fogli (1976)
Il sole, l'aria, la luce, il cielo (1977)
Io ti porto via (1978)
Che ne sai (1979)
Alla fine di un lavoro (1980)
Campione (1981)
Collezione (1982)
Compagnia (1982)
Il primo Riccardo Fogli (Collection) (1982)
Torna a sorridere (1984)
1985 (1985)
Le infinite vie del cuore (1987)
Storie di tutti i giorni (Collection) (1987)
Amore di guerra (1988)
Non finisce così (1989)
Sentirsi uniti (1990)
A metà del viaggio (1991)
Canzoni d'amore (Collection) (1991)
Teatrino meccanico (1992)
Mondo (Collection) (1992)
Nella fossa dei leoni (1994)
Fogli su Fogli (Unplugged) (1995)
Romanzo (1996)
Greatest Hits (1997)
Ballando (1998)
Matteo (Recordings of 1976) (1999)
Il mondo di Riccardo Fogli (Collection) (1999)
Storie di tutti i giorni (Live) (2002)
Il Vincitore – Musicfarm (2004)
Storie d'amore (Anthology + 3 unreleased) (2004)
Ci saranno giorni migliori (2005)
Riccardo Fogli (Book + CD) (2008)
Insieme (with Roby Facchinetti) (2017)

Singles
"Zan zan" \ "I 10 comandamenti dell'amore" (1970)
"Due regali" \ "Oh Mary" (1973)
"Strana donna" \ "La prima notte senza lei" (1973)
"Complici" \ "Strana donna" (1974)
"Amico sei un gigante" \ "Una volta di più" (1974)
"Guardami" \ "Gente per bene" (1975)
"Mondo" \ "Finito" (1976)
"Ti voglio dire" \ "Viaggio" (1976)
"Stella" \ "Anna ti ricordi" (1977)
"Ricordati" \ "Paola" (1977)
"Io ti porto via" \ "Si alza grande nel sole, la mia voglia di te" (1978)
"Che ne sai" \ "Come una volta" (1979)
"Pace" \ "Che amore vuoi che sia" (1979)
"Ti amo però" \ "È l'amore" (1980)
"Scene da un amore" \ "Angelina" (1980)
"Malinconia" \ "La strada" (1981)
"Storie di tutti i giorni" \ "L'amore che verrà" (1982)
"Compagnia" \ "Piccoli Tradimenti" (1982)
"Per Lucia" \ "Altri tempi" (1983)
"Torna a sorridere" \ "Diapositive" (1984)
"Sulla buona strada" \ "Greta" (1985)
"Voglio sognare" \ "Tempi andati" (1985)
"Dio come vorrei" \ "Buone vibrazioni" (1985)
"Amore di guerra" (1988)
"Non finisce così" \ "Delicata" (1989)
"Ma quale amore" \ "È tempo per noi" (1990)
"Io ti prego di ascoltare" \ "A metà del viaggio" (1991)
"In una notte così" \ "Un'altra volta te" (1992)
"Voglio le tue mani" \ "Se il cuore non-contasse niente, uomini col borsello" (1992)
"Storia di un'altra storia" (1993)
"Quando sei sola" (1994)
"Ci saranno giorni migliori" (2005)
"Strade" (with Roby Facchinetti) (2017)
"Le donne ci conoscono" (with Roby Facchinetti) (2017)
"Il segreto del tempo" (with Roby Facchinetti) (2018)

References

External links

Italian Fan Club

 
 

1947 births
Living people
Italian male singers
Eurovision Song Contest entrants for Italy
Eurovision Song Contest entrants of 1983
Sanremo Music Festival winners
People from Pontedera